BXL may refer to:

Places
 Brussels (common shorthand of its French name Bruxelles)
 Bheduasole railway station (station code BXL), Bhanga Bandh, Beliara, Bheduasole, Bankura, West Bengal, India
 Blue Lagoon Seaplane Base (IATA airport code BXL), Nanuya Lailai, Fiji; see List of airports by IATA airport code: B

Groups, organizations, companies
 Belarusian Extraleague, the top ice hockey league in Belarus
 Bonair Express (ICAO airline code BXL)
 Air Exel Belgique (ICAO airline code BXL), see List of defunct airlines of Belgium
 ICAO airline code BXL, used by several airlines successively, see List of defunct airlines of the Netherlands Antilles

Other uses
 Jeri language (ISO 639 language code bxl)

See also

 
 bx1
 BXI (disambiguation)